Karmayogi may refer to
 Karmayogi (1978 film), a Bollywood film directed by Ram Maheshwari
 Karmayogi (2012 film), a Malayalam film adaptation of Shakespeare's Hamlet, directed by V. K. Prakash